Kurt Hoffmann (12 November 1910 – 25 June 2001) was a German film director, the son of Carl Hoffmann. He directed 48 films between 1938 and 1971. He ran a production company Independent Film along with Heinz Angermeyer.

His 1958 film Wir Wunderkinder was entered into the 1st Moscow International Film Festival and his 1960 film The Haunted Castle was entered into the 2nd Moscow International Film Festival where it won the Silver Prize. His 1961 film The Marriage of Mr. Mississippi was entered into the 11th Berlin International Film Festival.

Selected filmography

References

External links

1910 births
2001 deaths
Film people from Freiburg im Breisgau
People from the Grand Duchy of Baden
Film directors from Baden-Württemberg
Best Director German Film Award winners